Thomas Wayne "Kip" McKean II (born May 31, 1954)  is an American former minister of the International Churches of Christ and is a current minister of the City of Angels International Christian Church and World Missions Evangelist of the International Christian Churches, also known as the "Portland/Sold-Out Discipling Movement".

Early life and family
McKean was born in Indianapolis, Indiana. He married Havana-born Elena Garcia-Bengochea on December 11, 1976. Bengochea is a Women's Ministry Leader in the City of Angels International Christian Church. They have three children.

Early work
McKean was baptized in 1972 while a freshman at the University of Florida in Gainesville. His mentor, Charles H. "Chuck" Lucas, was the evangelist of the 14th Street Church of Christ at the time.

In 1976, McKean was hired as campus minister for the Heritage Chapel Church of Christ, located at Eastern Illinois University in Charleston, Illinois.

Lexington Church of Christ
McKean moved to the Boston area in 1979 and began working in the Lexington Church of Christ. He asked them to "redefine their commitment to Christ," and introduced the use of discipling partners. The congregation grew rapidly, and was renamed the Boston Church of Christ.

The International Churches of Christ

In the mid-1980s, McKean became leader of both Boston and Crossroads Movements, eventually splitting from mainstream Churches of Christ, to become the International Church of Christ (ICOC).

The movement was first recognized as an independent religious group in 1992 when John Vaughn, a church growth specialist at Fuller Theological Seminary, listed them as a separate entity. Time magazine ran a full-page story on the movement in 1992 calling them "one of the world's fastest-growing and most innovative bands of Bible thumpers" that had grown into "a global empire of 103 congregations from California to Cairo with total Sunday attendance of 50,000", and which also raised concerns about authoritarian leadership, pressure placed on members, and whether the group should be considered a cult.

A formal break was made from the mainline Churches of Christ in 1993 when the movement organized under the name "International Churches of Christ."  This new designation formalized a division that was already in existence between those involved with the Crossroads/Boston Movement and "mainline" Churches of Christ.

In 1990, the McKeans moved to Los Angeles to lead the Los Angeles International Church of Christ, where they presided through the 1990s.

Resignation from the International Churches of Christ
Beginning in the late 1990s, McKean's moral authority as the leader of the movement came into question. Expectations for continued numerical growth and the pressure to sacrifice financially to support missionary efforts took its toll. Added to this was the loss of local leaders to new planting projects. In some areas, decreases in membership began to occur. At the same time, the realization was growing that the accumulated cost of his leadership style and associated advantages were outweighing the benefits. In 2001, McKean was asked by a group of long-standing elders in the ICOC to take a sabbatical from overall leadership of the ICOC.  On 12 November 2001, McKean wrote that he had decided to take a sabbatical from his role as the leader of the International Churches of Christ. He issued the following statement:

One year later, In November 2002, McKean announced his resignations from his roles as World Missions Evangelist and leader of the world sector leaders. He cited ongoing family problems, apologized for his own arrogance and said that his sins "have weakened and embittered many in our churches", and "these sins have surfaced in my family as well as the church." A year earlier one of his children had left the church.  Referring to this event, McKean said: "This, along with my leadership sins of arrogance, and not protecting the weak caused uncertainty in my leadership among some of the World Sector Leaders." Additionally, his over emphasis on numerical goals, not seeking discipling in his own life and claiming God's victories as his own, were cited by McKean as the reasons for his resignation.

His resignation was acknowledged by a letter from the elders the following day.

After a period leading an ICOC congregation in Portland, Oregon, he started a new church separated from the ICOC. This movement was named the International Christian Church by him. The period following McKean's resignation from leadership and departure was followed by a number of changes in the ICOC.

International Christian Church
On 15 October 2006, McKean published in the Portland church bulletin the first of a three-part series entitled, "Partners in the Gospel." Though the names "Portland Movement" and "Sold-Out Discipling Movement" had been used for over a year, these three articles were the first formal announcement of the birth of the International Christian Church.  It was only after this October 2006 date that any church affiliated with the Portland Church changed their name to ICC.

Since 2006, the congregations under McKean's leadership have been called the International Christian Church.

In April 2007, McKean and his wife Elena left the Portland International Christian Church to plant the City of Angels International Christian Church in Los Angeles. McKean and his wife were accompanied by 40 other leaders from the Portland ICC.

The ICC via their Good News Network broadcast claims a worldwide membership of over 10,000 as of May 2022.

Author
McKean has written a short book entitled Go Make Disciples: The Dream. He has also written First Principles Study Series and Second Principles: Survey of the Old Testament.

See also
 Churches of Christ
 Restoration Movement

References

External links

 KipMcKean.org, Official Website of Kip McKean.

American members of the Churches of Christ
American religious leaders
American Christian clergy
Restoration Movement
University of Florida alumni
Ministers of the Churches of Christ
1954 births
Living people
People from Indianapolis